Luislinda Dias de Valois Santos (born 20 January 1942 in Salvador) is a Brazilian jurist, magistrate and politician. Former member of the Brazilian Social Democracy Party (PSDB), was minister of Human Rights. She was the third black judge to be appointed in her home-state (Bahia), was desembargadora of the Court of Justice of the State of Bahia (TJ-BA). She left the office of Minister on 19 February 2018.

References

1942 births
Living people
People from Salvador, Bahia
20th-century Brazilian judges
Brazilian women judges
Brazilian politicians of African descent
Brazilian Social Democracy Party politicians
21st-century Brazilian women politicians
Brazilian Candomblés
20th-century women judges